Doomlands is an adult animated streaming television series, created by Josh O'Keefe, and presented on Roku. It is produced by Look Mom! Productions, a subsidiary of Blue Ant Media.

Described by its producer as "Mad Max meets Cheers in the Mos Eisley Cantina", it takes place in a post-apocalyptic wasteland setting, in a bar on a Ark II/Landmaster kind of large land vehicle, called The Oasis, owned and run by "the famous Danny Doom".

In animation style and writing, the show appears to be influenced by Superjail! and Rick and Morty.

On June 15, 2022, it was announced that the series was renewed for a second season.

Plot
The series is about the lives of Danny Doom and his staff of oddities who slings beers in a post-apocalyptic wasteland in their bar. They are ordered to fight against desert gangs, memory-stealing creeps, and mean bathroom graffiti.

Voice cast
Mark Little as Danny Doom
Kayla Lorette as Lhandi
Roger Bainbridge as Jep
Ashley Holiday Tavares as Xanthena

Episodes

Season 1 (2022)

Production
The series started as John O' Keefe's film project until it became a pilot. Production of the series began during the pandemic, when John O' Keefe handed the series over to Quibi (now The Roku Channel). Eventually, it was developed by Josh Bowen, who describes the streaming series as Mad Max meets Cheers in the Mos Eisley Cantina. Bowen produced the series in his mother's basement with the help of her meals. The voice actors for the series are Mark Little known for playing in the Canadian sitcoms, Cavendish and Mr. D voices Danny Doom and Kayla Lorette voices Lhandi.

References

External links

Doomlands on Roku

2022 American television series debuts
2022 Canadian television series debuts
2020s American adult animated television series
2020s American animated comedy television series
2020s American sitcoms
2020s Canadian adult animated television series
2020s Canadian animated comedy television series
2020s Canadian sitcoms
American adult animated adventure television series
American adult animated comedy television series
American adult animated science fiction television series
American flash adult animated television series
American animated sitcoms
Canadian adult animated adventure television series
Canadian adult animated comedy television series
Canadian adult animated science fiction television series
Canadian flash animated television series
Canadian animated sitcoms
English-language television shows
Post-apocalyptic animated television series
Television shows filmed in Toronto